The Dominion of New Zealand was the historical successor to the Colony of New Zealand. It was a constitutional monarchy with a high level of self-government within the British Empire.

New Zealand became a separate British Crown colony in 1841 and received responsible government with the Constitution Act in 1852. New Zealand chose not to take part in the Federation of Australia and became the Dominion of New Zealand on 26 September 1907, Dominion Day, by proclamation of King Edward VII. Dominion status was a public mark of the political independence that had evolved over half a century through responsible government.

Just under one million people lived in New Zealand in 1907 and cities such as Auckland and Wellington were growing rapidly. The Dominion of New Zealand allowed the British Government to shape its foreign policy, and it followed Britain into the First World War. The 1923 and 1926 Imperial Conferences decided that New Zealand should be allowed to negotiate its own political treaties, and the first commercial treaty was ratified in 1928 with Japan. When the Second World War broke out in 1939 the New Zealand Government made its own decision to enter the war.

In the post-war period, the term Dominion has fallen into disuse. Sovereignty on external affairs was granted with the Statute of Westminster in 1931 and adopted by the New Zealand Parliament in 1947. However, the 1907 royal proclamation of Dominion status has never been revoked and remains in force today.

Dominion status

Debate

The alteration in status was stirred by a sentiment on the part of the prime ministers of the self-governing colonies of the British Empire that a new term was necessary to differentiate them from the non-self-governing colonies. At the 1907 Imperial Conference, it was argued that self-governing colonies that were not styled 'Dominion' (like Canada) or 'commonwealth' (like Australia) should be designated by some such title as 'state of the empire'. After much debate over lexicon, the term 'Dominion' was decided upon.

Following the 1907 conference, the New Zealand House of Representatives passed a motion respectfully requesting that King Edward VII "take such steps as he may consider necessary" to change the designation of New Zealand from the Colony of New Zealand to the Dominion of New Zealand.

The adoption of the designation of Dominion would, "raise the status of New Zealand" stated Prime Minister Sir Joseph Ward and "… have no other effect than that of doing the country good". Ward also had regional imperial ambitions. He hoped the new designation would remind the world that New Zealand was not part of Australia. It would dignify New Zealand, a country he thought was "the natural centre for the government of the South Pacific".

Dominion status was strongly opposed by Leader of the Opposition Bill Massey, an ardent British imperialist, who suspected that the change would lead to demands for increases in viceregal and ministerial salaries.

Royal proclamation

A royal proclamation granting New Zealand the designation of 'Dominion' was issued on 9 September 1907. On 26 September the Prime Minister, Sir Joseph Ward, read the proclamation from the steps of Parliament:

Effect and reception

With the attaining of Dominion status, the colonial treasurer became the minister of finance and the Colonial Secretary's Office was renamed the Department of Internal Affairs. The proclamation of 10 September also designated members of the House of Representatives as "M.P." (Member of Parliament). Previously they were designated "M.H.R." (Member of the House of Representatives).

Letters patent were issued to confirm New Zealand's change in status, declaring that: "there shall be a Governor and Commander-in-Chief in and over Our Dominion of New Zealand". Dominion status allowed New Zealand to become virtually independent, while retaining the British monarch as head of state, represented by a governor appointed in consultation with the New Zealand Government. Control over defence, constitutional amendments, and (partially) foreign affairs remained with the British Government.

Joseph Ward had thought that New Zealanders would be "much gratified" with the new title. Dominion status was in fact received with limited enthusiasm or indifference from the general public, who were unable to discern any practical difference. Dominion status symbolised New Zealand's shift to self-governance, but this change had been practically accomplished with the first responsible government in the 1850s.

Historian Keith Sinclair later remarked:

According to Dame Silvia Cartwright, 18th Governor-General of New Zealand, in a 2001 speech:

The national flag, depicting the British Union Flag, remained the same. Until 1911 New Zealand used the royal coat of arms of the United Kingdom on all official documents and public buildings, but following its new status a new coat of arms for New Zealand was designed. A royal warrant granting armorial ensigns and supports was issued on 26 August 1911 and published in the New Zealand Gazette on 11 January 1912.

In 1917, letters patent were issued again re-designating the Governor as 'Governor-General' (as in other Dominions). The changes in the viceroy's title were intended to reflect more fully New Zealand's self-governing status. The 1917 letters patent constituted the office 'Governor-General and Commander-in-Chief in and over Our Dominion of New Zealand'.

Despite the new status, there was some apprehension in 1919 when Prime Minister Bill Massey signed the Treaty of Versailles (giving New Zealand membership of the League of Nations). This act was a turning point in New Zealand's diplomatic history, indicating that the Dominion had a degree of control over its foreign affairs. Massey himself did not view it as a symbolic act and would have preferred New Zealand to maintain a deferential role within the empire.

Dominion Day

To mark the granting of Dominion status, 26 September was declared Dominion Day. The first Dominion Day was celebrated on 25 September 1907, when one politician said it would be remembered as New Zealand's Fourth of July.

Today, it is observed only as a Provincial Anniversary Day holiday in South Canterbury. There is support in some quarters for the day to be revived as an alternative New Zealand Day, instead of renaming Waitangi Day, New Zealand's current national day.

Territorial expansion

The Antarctic territory of the Ross Dependency, previously under the sovereignty of the United Kingdom, is today regarded by New Zealand as having become part of the Dominion of New Zealand on 16 August 1923. The legality of that contemporary assertion has been questioned but is nonetheless the position of New Zealand.

The Cook Islands and Niue each already formed part of the Dominion of New Zealand on the date it was proclaimed. Both had become part of the Colony of New Zealand on 11 June 1901. Western Samoa was never part of New Zealand, having instead been the subject of a League of Nations Mandate and subsequently a United Nations Trusteeship Agreement. In 1982 the Judicial Committee of the Privy Council allowed Samoans born under New Zealand administration (i.e. prior to 1962) to claim New Zealand citizenship.

Changes to Dominion status

Balfour Declaration

The 1926 Imperial Conference devised the 'Balfour formula' of Dominion status, stating that: The Balfour Report further resolved that each respective governor-general occupied "the same position in relation to the administration of public affairs in the Dominion" as was held by the monarch in the United Kingdom. Consequently, the only advisers to the governor-general (and the monarch in New Zealand) were his New Zealand ministers.

Prime Minister Gordon Coates, who led the New Zealand delegation to the conference, called the Balfour Declaration a "poisonous document" that would weaken the British Empire as a whole.

Statute of Westminster

In 1931, the British (Imperial) Parliament passed the Statute of Westminster, which repealed the imperial Colonial Laws Validity Act and gave effect to resolutions passed by the imperial conferences of 1926 and 1930. It essentially gave legal recognition to the "de facto sovereignty" of the Dominions by removing Britain's ability to make laws for the Dominions without their consent: 

New Zealand initially viewed the Statute of Westminster as an "unnecessary legal complication that it perceived would weaken imperial relations." The New Zealand Government only allowed the Dominion of New Zealand to be cited in the statute provided that the operative sections did not apply unless adopted by the New Zealand Parliament. Preferring the British Government to handle most of its foreign affairs and defence, New Zealand held back from adopting the Statute of Westminster Act.

The First Labour Government (1935–1949) pursued a more independent path in foreign affairs, in spite of the statute remaining unadopted. In 1938 Deputy Prime Minister Peter Fraser told Parliament, "this country has to make up its own mind on international problems as a sovereign country – because under the Statute of Westminster ours is a sovereign country". In the 1944 Speech from the Throne the Governor-General announced the government's intention to adopt the Statute of Westminster. It was forced to abandon the proposal when the opposition accused the government of being disloyal to Britain at a time of need. 
Ironically, the National opposition prompted the adoption of the statute in 1947 when its leader, and future prime minister, Sidney Holland introduced a member's bill to abolish the Legislative Council. Because New Zealand required the consent of the British Parliament to make the necessary amendments to the New Zealand Constitution Act 1852, Peter Fraser, now Prime Minister, had a reason to finally adopt the statute. It was formally adopted on 25 November 1947 with the Statute of Westminster Adoption Act 1947, along with consenting legislation from the British Parliament.

New Zealand was the last Dominion listed in the statute to adopt it.

Dominion in disuse

After the Second World War, the country joined the United Nations as simply "New Zealand". A year later in 1946, Prime Minister Peter Fraser instructed government departments not to use the term Dominion any longer.

One of the first marks of New Zealand's sovereignty was the alteration of the monarch's title by the Royal Titles Act 1953. For the first time, the monarch's official New Zealand title mentioned New Zealand separately from the United Kingdom and the other Dominions, now called Realms:

The name of the state in official usage was also changed to the Realm of New Zealand. The term Dominion largely fell into disuse over the next decade. The term persisted the longest in the names of institutions (for instance, the Dominion Museum was not renamed the National Museum until as late as 1972), businesses, and in the constitutions of clubs and societies. One rare surviving usage is in the title of a newspaper, The Dominion Post (formerly The Dominion).

The change in style did not otherwise affect the legal status of New Zealand or its Government; the 1907 royal proclamation of Dominion status has never been revoked and remains in force today. As such, the term 'dominion' may be included in the formal title of New Zealand.

Nevertheless, the opinion of the New Zealand Government is that New Zealand became sovereign on foreign issues in 1947: "…both in terms of gaining formal legal control over the conduct of its foreign policy and the attainment of constitutional and plenary powers by its legislature". In passing the Constitution Act 1986 (effective 1 January 1987), New Zealand "unilaterally revoked all residual United Kingdom legislative power".

See also

History of New Zealand
Independence of New Zealand
Proclamation of accession of Elizabeth II

Notes

References

External links
Dominion status symposium 2007
Radio talks, 2007, about Dominion status (Radio New Zealand)

Further reading

Political history of New Zealand
British colonisation of Oceania
History of New Zealand
1907 establishments in New Zealand
States and territories established in 1907
New Zealand and the Commonwealth of Nations
States and territories disestablished in 1947